Tylopilus brunneus is a bolete fungus of the genus Tylopilus found in New Zealand. It was originally described by Robert Francis Ross McNabb as a species of Porphyrellus in 1967, and transferred to Tylopilus  by Carl Wolfe in 1980.

References

External links
 

brunneus
Fungi described in 1967
Fungi of New Zealand